An English team raised by Marylebone Cricket Club (MCC) toured New Zealand from December 1922 to February 1923 and played eight first-class matches including three against the New Zealand national cricket team. MCC also played the main provincial teams including Auckland (twice), Wellington, Canterbury and Otago. The overall tour included a short stopover in Ceylon, where a single minor match was played, and two visits to Australia where a total of seven first-class matches were played.

The team

Archie MacLaren (captain)
John Hartley (vice-captain)
David Brand
Freddie Calthorpe
Percy Chapman 
Tich Freeman
Clement Gibson
Wilfred Hill-Wood
Tom Lowry
John MacLean
Charles Titchmarsh
Harry Tyldesley
Alexander Wilkinson
Geoffrey Wilson

The manager was Henry Swan, who played in some of the minor matches. Philip Slater and Basil Hill-Wood also played in some of the minor matches in New Zealand. Freeman and Tyldesley were the only professionals. Robert St Leger Fowler was invited but was unable to tour and was replaced by Brand. The doctor and former Australian Test player Roland Pope accompanied the team throughout Australia and New Zealand at his own expense, serving as honorary physician.

Assessments
The tour made a loss of about £2000, a substantial amount at the time. The MCC and the New Zealand authorities shared the financial burden. One of the reasons for the loss was the extravagance of MacLaren, who insisted on having his wife with him throughout, at the tour's expense. Bill Ferguson, who travelled with the team as baggage master, said MacLaren never made "even a token attempt to make the tour pay its way, being content first and foremost with his own requirements – and he had expensive tastes". Ferguson said the MacLarens "frequently went away to Rotorua and such places for holidays", but he observed that their absences did not upset the rest of the team.

References

Bibliography
Don Neely & Richard Payne, Men in White: The History of New Zealand International Cricket, 1894–1985, Moa, Auckland, 1986, pp. 61–64

External links

1922 in English cricket
1923 in English cricket
1922 in Ceylon
1922 in New Zealand cricket
1923 in New Zealand cricket
New Zealand cricket seasons from 1918–19 to 1944–45
Sri Lankan cricket seasons from 1880–81 to 1971–72
English cricket tours of New Zealand
English cricket tours of Sri Lanka
International cricket competitions from 1918–19 to 1945
New Zealand 1922–23